Wayne County is a county in the U.S. state of New York. As of the 2020 Census, the population was 91,283. The county seat is Lyons. The name honors General Anthony Wayne, an American Revolutionary War hero and American statesman.

Wayne County is less than 50 miles west of, and is in the same Congressional District as, Syracuse.  Wayne County has been considered to be part of the Rochester, NY Metropolitan Statistical Area and lies on the south shore of Lake Ontario, forming part of the northern border of the United States with Canada.

Its location during the early westward expansion of the United States, on an international border and in a fertile farming region, has contributed to a rich cultural and economic history. Two world religions sprung from within its borders, and its inhabitants played important roles in abolitionism in the years leading up to the American Civil War. Nineteenth century War of 1812 skirmishes, Great Lakes sailing ship commerce and Erie Canal barge traffic have yielded to contemporary recognition as one of the world's most productive fruit growing regions. Wayne County ranks as New York's top apple producing county.

History
Prior to the arrival of Europeans, the land Wayne County encompasses was originally part of the Iroquois Confederacy, which had existed from around August 31, 1142. When counties were established in New York State on November 1, 1683, it became part of Albany County.

On April 11, 1823, Wayne County was formed by combining portions of Seneca and Ontario counties.

Westward expansion
The first settlers of European extraction came to the region located along the Ganargua River, just west of present-day Palmyra. In 1788 the area became part of the Phelps and Gorham Purchase, a  tract of land sold to Oliver Phelps and Nathaniel Gorham by the Commonwealth of Massachusetts.

The first westward road was one coming from near Utica to Geneva, and, with the building of the Cayuga Bridge in 1800, was the road chosen by nearly all of the westward travelers. This highway left the future Wayne County region somewhat isolated and settlers desiring to locate there came by way of streams and lakes lying to the north of the road. It was only a few years after that the "new road" came west, passing through the county, opening up the fertile Ganargua lands to easier settlement.

The first permanent settlement was started by John Swift and Col. John Jenkins in March 1789, about two miles (3 km) from Palmyra. In May of that year a small colony made up of the Stansell and Featherly families located at the junction of Ganargwa and the Canandaigua Outlet, calling the place Lyons, from a "fancied likeness of that city's location on the Rhone".

While Phelps and Gorham sold some land to settlers, they were unable to make payments on their land and much of the land in the Phelps Gorham purchase either reverted to Massachusetts and was resold or conveyed directly to Robert Morris, a major financier of the Revolutionary War and signer of the US Declaration of Independence. The Pulteney Purchase, or the Genesee Tract as it was also known, comprised all of the present-day counties of Ontario, Steuben and Yates, as well as portions of Allegany, Livingston, Monroe, Schuyler and Wayne. After Pulteney's death in 1805 the land was known as the Pulteney Estate.

Sir William Pulteney selected Charles Williamson as land agent to develop the purchased . In 1792, Williamson, a Scotsman, came to the unsettled wilderness in upstate New York to develop the land by building roads, selecting sites for towns, dividing land into lots, and building gristmills, taverns, stores and houses. Williamson selected Sodus Bay on Lake Ontario as the point for a future commercial center, with the idea that the lake and the Saint Lawrence River would be the outlet for the products of the region. In 1794 he had roads built from Palmyra to Phelpstown (present-day Phelps). Sodus was surveyed by Joseph Colt in lots of a quarter acre (1,000 m2), a hotel was built, and $20,000 was expended in the first two years in improvements. Sodus quickly passed from having an uncertain future to the head of the towns of the region.

War of 1812
Two small skirmishes were fought in the county during the War of 1812: one in Sodus in June 1813, and the other in Williamson a year later. In May 1814, British troops under the command of Sir James Yeo landed in the Williamson hamlet of Pultneyville. Yeo's fleet had already successfully raided Oswego to the east and unsuccessfully attacked Rochester to the west before attempting to obtain stores from Pultneyville. An agreement with the hamlet's residents was made, permitting the invaders to seize supplies without resistance. A dispute broke out, however, and weapons fire began on both sides, including cannon bombardment from Lake Ontario. A few citizens were killed or wounded and two were taken prisoner as the British fled.

Great Lakes commerce
Until the opening of the Erie Canal in 1823, Pultneyville, New York, at the mouth of Salmon Creek, was Wayne County's only port. From about 1811 through the 1890s (when the customs office closed), shipping in this small hamlet extended to the Atlantic Ocean and the world via the Saint Lawrence River. During the early years of the 19th century, activity in Pultneyville focused on agricultural commerce from the surrounding region (as far south as Canandaigua) and the maritime trade on the Great Lakes. In 1865, it was home to nearly 30 lake captains, and many sailors from both Pultneyville and Sodus Bay crewed on whalers around the world. In 1874 the first railroad appeared when the Lake Shore Railroad line opened and the center of trade moved three miles (5 km) south to Williamson and Pultneyville's significance as a commerce center sharply declined.

Religion: Wayne County and the Second Great Awakening
Wayne County played host to key events in the development of significant American religions during the country's Second Great Awakening period of the early 19th century. The Fox Sisters heard rappings from a dead peddler in Hydesville and spawned a movement that eventually garnered a million followers at its peak.

Palmyra became the birthplace of the Latter Day Saint movement in the 1820s.

Shakers in Wayne County
Sodus Bay also was the site of a community of Shakers from 1826 to 1836. The site provided convenient access to travel by water on the Great Lakes Ontario and Erie, for visits to Shakers who lived in Ohio. This site might also have been useful  for abolitionists moving former slaves to freedom in Canada via the Underground Railroad.

The first Shaker leadership team, Elders Jeremiah Talcott and Eldress Polly Lawrence, along with their assistants John Lockwood and Lucy Brown, came to Sodus from the Shakers' parent community at New Lebanon, New York. With 72 converts during their first year, they soon had 200 acres under cultivation. By 1835, the community had grown to almost 150.

However, they learned in 1835 that a canal had been proposed to be dug through their land, and by New York state law, the canal company had the right to seize the property it chose. The Shakers responded by selling their land and 23 buildings to the canal company and moving inland to the 1,700 acres they purchased at Groveland, in Livingston County, New York. However, the canal was never built; two years later, the Shakers were asked to take their property back, but, having reestablished their village elsewhere, and knowing that the land could later be taken for the same purpose, they refused.

Several diaries and journals describing the Shakers' early years at Sodus and Groveland can be found at the Western Reserve Historical Society, Cleveland, Ohio. These manuscripts are available on microfilm at more than 20 locations throughout the U.S.

Mormonism
Wayne County is the birthplace of the Latter Day Saint movement and Mormonism. Founder Joseph Smith, whose family lived on a farm that straddled the line between Palmyra and Manchester, claimed to have been visited by God the Father and Jesus Christ in 1820, an event known as the First Vision. In 1830 the Book of Mormon was first published in the village of Palmyra by E.B. Grandin, in the present Book of Mormon Historic Publication Site.

Spiritualism and the Fox sisters
Spiritualists often set March 31, 1848 as the beginning of their movement. On that date, Kate and Margaret Fox, of Hydesville, reported that they had made contact with the spirit of a murdered peddler. What made this an extraordinary event was that the spirit communicated through audible rapping noises, rather than simply appearing to a person in a trance. The evidence of the senses appealed to practical Americans, and the Fox sisters became a sensation. Demonstrations of mediumship (seances and automatic writing, for example) proved to be a profitable business, and soon became popular forms of entertainment and spiritual catharsis. The Foxes earned a living this way, as did many others.

Civil War and Underground Railroad
During the American Civil War Wayne County inhabitants were active in support of the Underground Railroad due to the area's proximity to slavery-free Canada.  Wayne County also raised companies for multiple volunteer Union regiments, including the 33rd New York Volunteer Infantry Regiment, the 98th New York Volunteer Infantry Regiment, the 111th New York Volunteer Infantry Regiment, and the 9th New York Heavy Artillery Regiment.

During the Civil War, men from Wayne served in the 111th New York Infantry, under Colonel Clinton D. MacDougall.

The 111th New York was present at, among others, the Battle of Gettysburg, the Battle of the Wilderness, the Battle of Cold Harbor and the Appomattox Campaign. During the Battle of Gettysburg, the 111th took the second highest casualties as a regiment of the entire battle.

Throughout the war, the regiment took a total of 1803 casualties, of which 158 were Killed in action, 557 were Wounded in action (490 of whom recovered to some extent), and 1088 Missing in action.

Erie Canal
The Erie Canal transits the southern edge of the county. The villages of Clyde, Lyons, Newark, Palmyra and Macedon all became homes to canal locks when the Albany to Rochester section of the canal opened on September 10, 1823. On that day these communities became part of a direct water-link between the eastern seaboard metropolises of New York City and Baltimore and America's expanding western frontier.

Hoffman essays
Wayne County high school seniors are offered the opportunity to win a scholarship by The Augustus L. and Jennie D. Hoffman Foundation Scholarship Essay Program. Established in 1954 to encourage the study of local history, students research and write essays on some aspect of Wayne County history or civic affairs. Between its inception and 2007 over 600 essays have been submitted.

Nuclear power
On June 1, 1970, the Robert E. Ginna Nuclear Power Plant started commercial operation on the shores of Lake Ontario, just over the Monroe County line in the Town of Ontario.

The Ginna plant was the site of a minor nuclear accident when, on January 25, 1982, a small amount of radioactive steam leaked into the air after a steam-generator tube ruptured.  The leak which lasted 93 minutes led to the declaration of a site emergency.  The rupture was caused by a small pie-pan-shaped object left in the steam generator during an outage.  This was not the first time a tube rupture had occurred at an American reactor but following on so closely behind the Three Mile Island accident caused considerable attention to be focused on the incident at the Ginna plant. In total, 485.3 curies of noble gas and 1.15 millicuries of iodine-131 were released to the environment.

Historical societies
In addition to the county historical society, there are a number of other historical preservation organizations. Most of these are town or village based.

 Newark-Arcadia Historical Society
 Butler Historical Preservation Society
 Galen Historical Society
 Historic Palmyra, Inc.
 Lyons Heritage Society
 Macedon Historical Society
 Marion Historical Society
 Ontario Historical & L.P. Society
 Pultneyville Historical (please refer to Williamson-Pultneyville Historical Society)
 Red Creek Historical Society
 Rose Historical Society
 Town of Sodus Historical Society
 Sodus Bay Historical Society
 Walworth Historical Society
 Wayne County Historical Society
 Williamson-Pultneyville Historical Society (www.w-phs.org)
 Wolcott Historical Society

Law, government and politics
The county is governed by a Board of Supervisors, composed of the town supervisors from each of the county's fifteen towns. The board's chairman is selected from amongst the supervisors. The 2007 county budget was $154 million.

The county seat is the town of Lyons and bi-weekly board meetings are held in the Wayne County Court House in the hamlet.  In August 2010, the board made history by convening outside of Lyons for the first time—at the Wayne County fairgrounds in Palmyra.

The Wayne Supreme & County Court (7th Judicial District) sits in Lyons and hears felony cases as well as a few civil cases; the Wayne County Drug Treatment Court also provides an opportunity for recovering drug addicts to work with each other and improve their lifestyles.  Vehicle and traffic matters, small claims, evictions, civil matters and criminal offenses in Wayne County are heard in locally-funded town and village courts (collectively known as the Justice Courts).

Politics

|}

As of November 2013, Wayne County had a total of 56,589 voters registered (53,891 active, 2,698 inactive).  Of those totals: 14,339 were registered as Democrats (13,574 active, 765 inactive); 23,144 as Republicans (22,338 active, 806 inactive); 3,035 as Independents (2,831 active, 204 inactive); 1,517 as Conservative (1,454 active, 63 inactive); and the rest as Greens, Libertarians, and other minor parties.    In the 2010 gubernatorial election, Wayne County cast 12,126 Democratic votes for Andrew M. Cuomo, 9,552 Republican votes for Carl Paladino, 1,153 Independent votes for Cuomo, 2,489 Conservative votes for Paladino, 490 Working Families Party votes for Cuomo, and 401 Taxpayers Party votes for Paladino.

Wayne County has only voted for the Democratic presidential candidate once since the Republican Party was founded in 1854.

In the 2014 gubernatorial election, Wayne County cast 5,874 Democratic votes for Andrew M. Cuomo, 12,460 Republican votes for Rob Astorino, 306 Independent votes for Cuomo, 2,709 Conservative votes for Astorino, 289 Working Families Party plus 141 Women's Equality Party votes for Cuomo, and 642 Stop Common Core Party votes for Astorino.

Geography

Wayne County is in the western part of New York State, east of Rochester and northwest of Syracuse, on the south shore of Lake Ontario.  Sodus Bay is located on the north shoreline of the county. Wayne is bounded by five other New York counties: the northern boundary is Lake Ontario with Canada on the opposite shore; the western boundary is Monroe County; and the eastern boundary is Cayuga County; the south boundary is shared with Ontario and Seneca counties.

The Clinton Formation, a band of red hematite across the county, led to a thriving iron industry during the 19th century. Furnaces were located in the Towns of Ontario and Wolcott.

Wayne County is included in the Eastern Great Lakes and Hudson Lowlands ecoregion, which extends along the south shores of Lake Erie and Lake Ontario and the St. Lawrence River to Lake Champlain, and south down the Hudson River. This region was glaciated during the last ice age, and contains prominent glacial features including till and drumlins, as well as the valleys containing the Finger Lakes. Part of the area was covered by Glacial Lake Iroquois, while regions further to the east were flooded under the Champlain Sea. At one point during the melting of the glaciers, the Great Lakes drained down the Hudson River to the Atlantic Ocean.

Adjacent counties
 Cayuga County – east
 Seneca County – southeast
 Ontario County – south
 Monroe County – west

Major highways

  New York State Route 14
  New York State Route 21
  New York State Route 31
  New York State Route 31F
  New York State Route 88
  New York State Route 89
  New York State Route 104
  New York State Route 104A
  New York State Route 286
  New York State Route 350
  New York State Route 370
  New York State Route 414
  New York State Route 441

National protected area
 Montezuma National Wildlife Refuge (part)

Demographics

2020 Census

As of the census of 2010, there were 93,772 people, 36,585 households, and 25,304 families residing in the county. The population density was 155 people per square mile (60/km2).

There were 36,585 households, out of which 29.5% had children under the age of 18 living with them, 53.0% were married couples living together, 11.0% had a female householder with no husband present, and 30.8% were non-families. 24.5% of all households were made up of individuals, and 9.8% had someone living alone who was 65 years of age or older. The average household size was 2.53 and the average family size was 2.99.

In the county, the population was spread out, with 26.2% under the age of 20, 5.1% from 20 to 24, 23.8% from 25 to 44, 30.7% from 45 to 64, and 14.2% who were 65 years of age or older. The median age was 41.6 years. For every 100 females, there were 98.5 males. For every 100 females age 18 and over, there were 97.3 males.

The median income for a household in the county was $52,601, and the median income for a family was $62,677. Males had a median income of $47,056 versus $35,684 for females. The per capita income for the county was $25,327. About 7.8% of families and 11.3% of the population were below the poverty line, including 16.4% of those under age 18 and 6.9% of those age 65 or over.

Recent racial/ethnic makeup
As of the 2013 American Community Survey, the racial makeup of the county was 93.3% White alone, 3.6% African American alone, 0.3% Native American, 0.7% Asian, 0.0% Pacific Islander, and 1.4% from two or more races. Hispanic or Latino of any race were 3.8% of the population, while white alone, not Hispanic or Latino, constituted 94.6% of the population.

Housing
There were 41,057 housing units at an average density of 68 per square mile (26/km2). 10.9% of housing units were vacant.

There were 36,585 occupied housing units in the town. 28,106 were owner-occupied units (76.8%), while 8,479 were renter-occupied (23.2%). The homeowner vacancy rate was 1.5% of total units. The rental unit vacancy rate was 9.4%.

Earlier demographic statistics
Families made up 70 percent of the households in Wayne County in 2005. This figure includes both married-couple families (59 percent) and other families (12 percent). Non-family households made up 30 percent of all households. Most of these households were people living alone, but some were composed of people living in households in which no one was related to the householder. Source: American Community Survey, 2005  18.0% were of German, 12.8% Italian, 12.6% English, 11.6% Dutch, 11.4% Irish and 8.9% American ancestry according to Census 2000. 95.7% spoke English as their first language, 2.2% Spanish, 1.8% spoke French and 0.2% spoke another language.

Economy
According to the Wayne County Industrial Development Agency, there are over 150 manufacturing firms in Wayne County, including several Fortune 500 companies located in the county based on market access, a modern transportation network, and favorable industrial conditions. These companies benefit from a skilled workforce including graduates from some of the colleges and universities located within an hour's drive of Wayne County including the University of Rochester, Cornell University, Colgate University and Syracuse University. From its location midway between Rochester and Syracuse, Wayne County is part of the Finger Lakes region (which includes Cayuga, Genesee, Livingston, Monroe, Ontario, Orleans, Seneca, Wayne, Wyoming, and Yates counties) whose businesses annually export an estimated $16 billion in goods.

The Finger Lakes region made $1.2 billion in agricultural sales in 2007, which represented 27.9 percent of the total farm sales in New York. Wayne County was the State’s top producer of fruits, tree nuts, and berries. Apples are a major crop in Wayne—the county was the State’s top producer of apples and ranked third in the nation in 2007.

The following quick facts apply to Wayne County businesses:
  Private nonfarm establishments, 2011  1,707
  Private nonfarm employment, 2011  19,600
  Private nonfarm employment, percent change 2010–2011  -0.5%
  Nonemployer establishments, 2011  4,929
  Total number of firms, 2007  6,834
  Black-owned firms, percent, 2007  1.0%
  American Indian and Alaska Native owned firms, percent, 2007  Suppressed; does not meet publication standards 
  Asian-owned firms, percent, 2007  Suppressed
  Native Hawaiian and Other Pacific Islander owned firms, percent, 2007  Fewer than 25
  Hispanic-owned firms, percent, 2007 2.7%
  Women-owned firms, percent, 2007  28.6%
  Manufacturers shipments, 2007 ($1000)  1,888,986
  Merchant wholesaler sales, 2007 ($1000)  189,350
  Retail sales, 2007 ($1000)  816,657
  Retail sales per capita, 2007  $8,922
  Accommodation and foodservices sales, 2007 ($1000)  52,348
  Building permits, 2012  86
  Federal spending, 2008  $675,565

Education
Wayne County does not have a single unified school district to deliver K-12 education, but multiple central school districts.  Each district is governed by a locally-elected board of education, run by a hired superintendent, and funded largely through property taxes, as well as state and federal aid.  These districts include:
 Palmyra-Macedon Central School District
 Wayne Central School District
 Gananda Central School District
 Newark Central School District
 Marion Central School District
 Williamson Central School District
 Lyons Central School District
 North Rose-Wolcott Central School District
 Red Creek Central School District
 Sodus Central School District
 Clyde-Savannah Central School District

As with all educational activities in New York State, Wayne County's school systems are ultimately answerable to the New York State Board of Regents and the New York State Education Department, as well as their local communities.  These districts also participate in the Wayne Finger Lakes Board of Cooperative Educational Services (BOCES), a state-established organization which shares common educational resources and has its own elected board and superintendent.

Wayne County also has several private, parochial/religiously-based schools, including:
 East Palmyra Christian School
 Heritage Baptist Christian School, Palmyra

Wayne County is not home to any regionally-accredited institutions of higher learning, but has a satellite campus of Finger Lakes Community College in Newark to serve the associate degree-level learner and has access to many excellent public and private colleges and universities in immediately adjacent counties (such as SUNY Brockport, SUNY Oswego, University of Rochester, and Hobart and William Smith Colleges, Cayuga Community College to name just a few).

Culture
Wayne County is home to several festivals and parades, most from late spring through early fall due to the Upstate New York climate. Some of the more notable, listed in order of occurrence, include:
 Apple Blossom Festival (Williamson, third week in May)
 Peppermint Days (Lyons, second weekend in July)
 Rose Parade (Newark, third weekend in July)
 Hill Cumorah Pageant (Palmyra and Manchester, Ontario County, formerly third week in July, permanently canceled after 2019)
  Pultneyville Homecoming Festivities Historic Hamlet of Pultneyville in Town of Williamson, Wayne County on Seaway Trail; www.w-phs.org (3rd weekend every July)
 CNY Wine & Jazz Festival (Wolcott, first Saturday in August)
 Palmyra Pirate Weekend including "Pirates of the Erie Canal", (Palmyra, Second weekend in August)
 Wayne County Fair (Palmyra, second week in August)
 Lumberjack Festival (Macedon Center, second weekend in September)
 Canaltown Days (Palmyra, third weekend in September)
 Savannah's Potato Festival (Savannah, third weekend in September)
 The Bog & Grog (Wallington, 1st Sunday after Mother's Day and 1st Sunday after Labor Day
 The Neighborhood Acting Company (Musical performances in the fall, typically the weekend before Thanksgiving  http://www.neighborhoodactingcompany.com)

Also, many of Wayne County's volunteer fire departments host "firemen's carnivals" throughout the summer, with parades, rides, food, fireworks, and attractions which become a centerpiece of the summer social circuit.

Communities
The county has no cities. There are 15 towns and seven villages.

Larger settlements

Towns

 Arcadia
 Butler
 Galen
 Huron
 Lyons
 Macedon
 Marion
 Ontario
 Palmyra
 Rose
 Savannah
 Sodus
 Walworth
 Williamson
 Wolcott

Villages

Other communities
Wayne county has a number of unincorporated communities. Most are considered hamlets.

 Alloway
 Alton
 Angells Corners
 Bear Creek
 Bonnie Castle
 Butler Center
 Desbrough Park
 East Bay Park
 East Palmyra
 East Williamson
 Evans Corner
 Fairville
 Fairville Station
 Fort Hill
 Furnace Village
 Furnaceville
 Glenmark
 Huddle
 Huron
 Hydesville
 Joy
 Lake Bluff
 Lakeside
 Lincoln
 Lock Berlin
 Lockpit
 Lummisville
 Macedon Center
 Marbletown
 Marengo
 Minsteed
 Mud Mills
 Noble Corner
 North Huron
 North Macedon
 North Wolcott
 Ontario Center
 Ontario-on-the-Lake
 Owls Nest
 Pilgrimport
 Resort
 Rice Mill
 Rose
 Shaker Heights
 Shephards Corner
 Sodus Center
 South Butler
 South Sodus
 Sunset View
 Thorntons Corner
 Union Hill
 Wallington
 Wayne Center
 Wayneport
 West Butler
 West Walworth
 Westbury
 Yellow Mills
 York
 Zurich

See also

 List of counties in New York
 National Register of Historic Places listings in Wayne County, New York

References

Citations

Sources

Further reading

External links
 Wayne County, New York (official site)
 Wayne County, New York Tourism site
 
 Early history of Wayne County
 Wayne County Historical Aerial Photographs of New York , Cornell University Library & Cornell Institute for Resource Information Sciences
 Wayne County Fair official website
 Trails in Wayne County
 Museum of Wayne County History
 Wayne County Office of the County Historian

 
1823 establishments in New York (state)
Populated places established in 1823
Rochester metropolitan area, New York
Populated places on the Underground Railroad